Hypatia is a small stone found in Egypt  1996, which may be the first known specimen of a comet nucleus on Earth, although defying physically-accepted models for hypervelocity processing of organic material.

Discovery and name

The rock was named after Hypatia of Alexandria ( 350–370 AD – 415 AD) – the philosopher, astronomer, mathematician, and inventor.

Although its status as an extraterrestrial rock is widely accepted, Hypatia is not officially classified as a true meteorite specimen by the Meteoritical Society due to its small size.  The original sample was cut apart and sent to multiple labs for study, reducing its original size of approximately 30 grams to about four grams.

Research 
Tests done in South Africa by researchers Jan Kramers and Georgy Belyanin of the University of Johannesburg show that Hypatia contains microscopic diamonds. Due to the presence of several anomalous isotopic distributions unknown in prior association, some believe the Hypatia material is necessarily of extraterrestrial origin, although significant terrestrial contamination is dismissed by proponents as being impact-authigenic from incorporation of terrestrial atmosphere, the physics of which are unresolved. Further speculation from comparative summary statistical associations support that Hypatia is a relict fragment of the hypothetical impacting body assumed to have produced the chemically-dissimilar Libyan desert glass. If this association holds, Hypatia may have impacted Earth approximately 28 million years ago.  Its unusual chemistry has prompted further speculation that Hypatia may predate the formation of the Solar System.

In 2018 Georgy Belyanin of the University of Johannesburg and colleagues found compounds including polyaromatic hydrocarbons and silicon carbide associated with a previously-unknown nickel phosphide compound. Other observations supporting non-terrestrial origin for the Hypatia samples include ratios of silicon to carbon anti-correlated to terrestrial averages, or those of major planets like Mars or Venus. Some samples of interstellar dust overlap Hypatia distributions, although Hypatia's elemental chemistry also overlaps some terrestrial distributions.

In 2022, Kramers and Andreoli proposed the hypothesis that the Hypatia stone represents the first evidence on Earth of a type Ia supernova explosion.

See also

References

External links
 Hypatia (stone) images

Meteorites found in Egypt
1996 in Egypt
1996 in science
Individual rocks
Comets
Meteorites